Dr John Yule MD FRSE FRCPE MWS (1762–1827) was an 18th/19th century Scottish physician remembered as a botanist. He specialised in conifers and was the first to academically differentiate larch, spruce and fir.

Life

He was born in Edinburgh in 1762 the son of John Yule a baxter (baker) on Dub Row.

He studied Medicine at Edinburgh University gaining his doctorate (MD) in 1785. After qualifying he worked in Sheffield for several years before returning to Edinburgh around 1800. He was one of he earliest corresponding members of the Society of Antiquaries of Scotland during his time in Sheffield.

In 1801 he was living on Nicolson Street in Edinburgh's South side.

In 1815 he was elected a Fellow of the Royal Society of Edinburgh. His proposers were Sir George Steuart Mackenzie, Thomas Allan, and Alexander Christison. He was then living at 23 York Place.

He died at home 23 York Place on 23 February 1827.

He is buried in New Calton Cemetery.

Publications

The Aspect of the Proper Pines (1820)

Family

His great nephews included Henry Yule and George Udny Yule.

References

1762 births
1827 deaths
Scientists from Edinburgh
Alumni of the University of Edinburgh Medical School
Scottish botanists
Fellows of the Royal Society of Edinburgh
Burials at the New Calton Burial Ground